Repetier-Host is a 3D printing application developed by Hot-World GmbH & Co. KG.

References

External links 
 Official website
 Github page

3D printing
Windows software
MacOS software
Linux software